The 2016 World University Squash Championship is the 2016 edition of the World University Squash, which serves as the individual world squash championship for students. The event was scheduled to take place in Kuala Lumpur in Malaysia.

Draw and results

Men's Single

Women's Single

Team Event

See also
World University Squash Championships
World Squash Federation

References

External links
WSF World University page

Squash
Squash tournaments in Malaysia
World University
World University Squash Championships
Sport in Kuala Lumpur
2010s in Kuala Lumpur
World University Squash Championships